SpaceX Crew-1  (was also known as USCV-1 or simply Crew-1) was the first operational crewed flight of a Crew Dragon spacecraft, and the maiden flight of the Crew Dragon Resilience spacecraft. It was also the second crewed orbital flight launch by the United States since that of STS-135 in July 2011. Resilience launched on 16 November 2020 at 00:27:17 UTC on a Falcon 9 from Kennedy Space Center Launch Complex 39A (LC-39A), carrying NASA astronauts Michael Hopkins, Victor Glover and Shannon Walker along with JAXA astronaut Soichi Noguchi, all members of the Expedition 64 crew. The mission was the second overall crewed orbital flight of the Crew Dragon.

Crew-1 was the first operational mission to the International Space Station (ISS) in the Commercial Crew Program. Originally designated "USCV-1" by NASA in 2012, the launch date was delayed several times from the original date of November 2016. The mission was scheduled to depart the ISS on 28 April 2021, but due to weather returned to Earth on 2 May 2021. The capsule splashed down at 06:56:33 UTC, to be reused on Inspiration4. It was the first nighttime splashdown for NASA astronauts since Apollo 8 in 1968. On 7 February 2021, the Crew-1 broke the record for the longest spaceflight by a U.S. crewed vehicle, surpassing the 84-day mark set by an Apollo capsule on the final flight to the Skylab (Skylab-4) space station on 8 February 1974.

Background 
The first operational mission in the Commercial Crew Program, originally designated "USCV-1" (United States Crew Vehicle-mission 1) by NASA, was initially announced in November 2012, with a launch date set for November 2016. In April 2013, it was announced that the launch would be delayed by one year to November 2017. It was then delayed into 2019 and 2020, pending the success of the uncrewed and crewed demonstration missions, respectively. Following the Crew Dragon Demonstration Mission 2, Crew-1 was tentatively scheduled for September 2020; further delays occurred to align with the ongoing COVID-19 pandemic restrictions and their impact on the schedule of ISS crew rotations and cargo delivery missions, and then again because of concerns about an issue with the gas generators on the Merlin 1D engines.

On 29 September 2020, mission commander Michael Hopkins revealed during a NASA press conference that the capsule's crew had chosen to name it Resilience. Due to the COVID-19 pandemic in Florida, the Kennedy Space Center Visitor Complex only allowed a few people to watch the launch in person from the KSC premises.

Crew 
NASA astronauts Michael S. Hopkins and Victor J. Glover were announced as the crew on 3 August 2018. JAXA astronaut Soichi Noguchi and the third NASA astronaut, Shannon Walker, were added to the crew on 31 March 2020.

Preparations 
Crew-1's Falcon 9 launch vehicle arrived at Cape Canaveral, Florida, on 14 July 2020. Crew Dragon capsule C207 arrived at SpaceX processing facilities in Florida, on 18 August 2020. The successful launch of the Falcon 9 launch vehicle from Cape Canaveral Air Force Station (CCAFS) on 5 November 2020 was a milestone leading up to the Crew-1 mission. Falcon 9 successfully deployed a GPS navigation satellite (GPS III-04) for the United States Space Force (USSF), confirming that engineers had resolved an issue with Merlin 1D engines that delayed the GPS mission and the Crew-1 flight.

The crew arrived at Kennedy Space Center via a NASA Gulfstream jet on 8 November 2020 at 13:53 UTC. A Flight Readiness Review (FRR) convened by NASA officials was scheduled on 10 November 2020 to discuss unresolved technical issues, review the status of launch preparations, and give approval for teams to proceed with the Crew-1 mission. NASA officials gave approval on 10 November 2020 for SpaceX to begin regular crew rotation flights to the International Space Station, signaling a transition from development to operations for the human-rated Crew Dragon spacecraft. The launch vehicle was lifted to its vertical position on the pad for a test firing of its Merlin-1D main engines on 11 November 2020 at 20:49 UTC. A dry dress rehearsal (DDR) on 12 November 2020 saw the crew put on their pressure suits and climb into Resilience. SpaceX ran a launch readiness review (LRR) on 13 November 2020.

Mission 

On 15 November 2020, final pre-launch preparations were completed. The hatch of Resilience was closed at 22:32 UTC, but reopened briefly after a slight drop in pressure was detected. Troubleshooting the hatch seal led to discovery of a small amount of foreign object debris (FOD) in the seal. The hatch was then closed again, and mission controllers proceeded with the countdown. No further concerns were noted, and on 16 November 2020 at 00:27:17 UTC, Resilience lifted off successfully. Its Falcon 9 first-stage booster, SN B1061.1, landed on the autonomous spaceport drone ship Just Read the Instructions. The astronauts entered a stable orbit after about nine minutes. For this mission, the crew had chosen a plush toy of "The Child" (also known as "Baby Yoda") from The Mandalorian as a Zero-G indicator. The crew were awakened on the second day of the flight with Phil Collins's "In the Air Tonight".

Resilience docked to the International Docking Adapter (IDA) on the Harmony module on 17 November 2020 at 04:01 UTC. Over the course of the mission, the four astronauts lived and worked alongside the three astronauts of the Soyuz MS-17 mission. Together, the two missions form ISS Expedition 64. Assuming the regular ISS crew rotation schedule is adhered to, the crew transfer to Expedition 65 following the departure of Soyuz MS-17, on 17 April 2021.

On 5 April 2021, the Crew-1 astronauts relocated their spacecraft from Harmony forward to Harmony zenith by using the Draco thrusters that are mounted on the side of Dragon Resilience's trunk, to make way for the arrival and docking of the SpaceX Crew-2 spacecraft, launched on 23 April 2021.

In July 2022, it was reported that some of the debris from Crew 1 Dragon crashed into a farm in Australia.

Timeline

See also 

 Boeing Starliner
 Crew Dragon Demo-2
 SpaceX Dragon 2

Notes

References 

SpaceX Dragon 2
Spacecraft launched in 2020
Spacecraft which reentered in 2021
SpaceX payloads contracted by NASA
SpaceX human spaceflights
2020 in the United States
2021 in the United States